Club Deportivo Agoncillo is a Spanish football team based in Agoncillo in the autonomous community of La Rioja. Founded in 1980, it plays in 3ª - Group 16. Its stadium is Estadio San Roque with a capacity of 2,000 seaters.

History 
In the 2017-18 season the club finished 16th in the Tercera División, Group 16.

Season to season

15 seasons in Tercera División

References

External links
Futbolme team profile  
Unofficial blog 
Official twitter profile

Football clubs in La Rioja (Spain)
Association football clubs established in 1980
1980 establishments in Spain